Nderitu Gachagua (29 July 1952 – 24 February 2017) was a Kenyan politician who served as the first governor of Nyeri County having been elected in March 2013 on a GNU party ticket alongside deputy governor, Wamathai Samwel Githaiga. Nderitu studied law at the University of Nairobi. Before becoming governor, he served as the Member of Parliament for Mathira constituency.

Gachagua died on 24 February 2017 at the Royal Marsden Hospital in London while undergoing treatment for pancreatic cancer.

References

Family 
Rigathi Gachacgua (Riggy G) Deputy President
James Reriani Gachagua (Deceased September 2022)

1953 births
2017 deaths
County Governors of Kenya
Members of the National Assembly (Kenya)
Deaths from pancreatic cancer